Evergreen Field  was a public-use airport located  east of the central business district of Vancouver, a city in Clark County, Washington, United States. It was located northeast of the intersection of Southeast Mill Plain Boulevard & Southeast 136th Avenue.

The airport was founded in 1946 by Wally Olson. Since 1964 it was home to the Northwest Antique Airplane Club (NWAAC) and the Evergreen Fly-In. A residential airpark was established adjacent to the airport in 1968. After Olson's death in 1997, his family continued to operate the airport until closing it in July 2006. The property was reportedly being sold for $15 million to a developer, but the $215 million redevelopment deal fell through in 2007.

Facilities 

References

External links 
Wally Olson/Evergreen Airpark - photos and remembrances

Airports in Washington (state)
Defunct airports in Washington (state)